Tirlapur  is a village in the southern state of Karnataka, India. It is located in the Navalgund taluk of Dharwad district in Karnataka.

Demographics
As of the 2011 Census of India there were 1,125 households in Tirlapur and a total population of 5,585 consisting of 2,873 males and 2,712 females. There were 679 children ages 0-6.

See also
 Dharwad
 Districts of Karnataka

References

External links
 http://Dharwad.nic.in/

Villages in Dharwad district